Fred Fielding (6 September 1889 – 8 August 1918) was an Australian rules footballer who played with South Melbourne and Collingwood in the Victorian Football League.

Family
The son of James Fielding (-1901), and Winifred Fielding (-1936), née Gleeson,  he was born on 6 September 1889.

Military
He enlisted to serve in World War I using the name James Gleeson (his father's given name and his mother's maiden name) while in Perth in 1916.

Death
He died in action on the first day of the Hundred Days Offensive, the final series of offensives by the Allies on the Western Front in World War I.

See also
 List of Victorian Football League players who died in active service

Footnotes

References
 Roll of Honour: Private Fred Fielding, also known as James Gleeson (5596), Australian War Memorial.
 World War I Service Record: Fred Fielding (a.k.a. James Gleeson) (5596), National Archives of Australia.

External links

Australian rules footballers from Victoria (Australia)
Sydney Swans players
Collingwood Football Club players
Australian military personnel killed in World War I
South Bendigo Football Club players
1889 births
1918 deaths